Thomas Seamer (also Seymour) (July 15, 1632 – 1712) was a founding settler of Norwalk, Connecticut. He served as a deputy of the General Assembly of the Connecticut Colony from Norwalk in the May 1690 session.

He was the son of Captain Richard Seamer and Mercy Ruscoe, who were founding settlers of Hartford. Thomas came to New England with his parents about 1638, at the age of six. He lived in Hartford until about 1651, when he moved to Norwalk with his parents. In 1655, his father died, and he was the only one among his siblings who was of age. His mother soon remarried and removed to Farmington with her younger children. Thomas inherited his father's lands in Norwalk, where he lived until his death.

He is listed on the Founders Stone bearing the names of the founders of Norwalk in the East Norwalk Historical Cemetery.

References

1632 births
1712 deaths
American Puritans
Founding settlers of Norwalk, Connecticut
People from Sawbridgeworth